The University of Minnesota Press is a university press that is part of the University of Minnesota. It had annual revenues of just over $8 million in fiscal year 2018.

Founded in 1925, the University of Minnesota Press is best known for its books in social theory and cultural theory, critical theory, race and ethnic studies, urbanism, feminist criticism, and media studies.

The University of Minnesota Press also publishes a significant number of translations of major works of European and Latin American thought and scholarship, as well as a diverse list of works on the cultural and natural heritage of the state and the upper Midwest region.

Journals
The University of Minnesota Press's catalog of academic journals totals thirteen publications:
Buildings & Landscapes: Journal of the Vernacular Architecture Forum
Critical Ethnic Studies
Cultural Critique
Environment, Space, Place
Future Anterior
Journal of American Indian Education
Mechademia: Second Arc
The Moving Image: The Journal of the Association of Moving Image Archivists
Native American and Indigenous Studies
Norwegian-American Studies
Preservation Education and Research
Verge: Studies in Global Asias
Wíčazo Ša Review

See also

 List of English-language book publishing companies
 List of university presses

References

External links

Partner Presses, Oxford Scholarship Online
Theory and History of Literature

Press
Minnesota, University of
Publishing companies established in 1925
1925 establishments in Minnesota
Native American literature
Book publishing companies based in Minnesota